The Association Étoile Noire de Strasbourg  is a French ice hockey team based in Strasbourg and playing in Division 1.

History
The team currently uses the name of "Étoile Noire de Strasbourg" (Strasbourg Black Star) and was founded in 2000; they play home games at the Patinoire Iceberg.

The team reached Ligue Magnus after they became Division 1 champions in 2006. They appeared in the Magnus Cup playoff final in 2011.
They were relegated back to Division 1 after finishing in twelfth and last place of the Ligue Magnus standings in 2019.

Roster
Updated February 13, 2019.

Former players

 Jacob Goldberg
 David Cayer
 Mickey Gilchrist
 Tomy Joly
 Maxime Mallette
 Steve Pelletier
 Wes Jarvis

 Jakub Suchánek

 Heikki Laine

 Romain Bonnefond

 Pavol Resetka
 Miroslav Stolc

References

External links
 Official website 

Ice hockey teams in France
Sport in Strasbourg
Ice hockey clubs established in 2000
2000 establishments in France